John Manuel Thurston (born December 27, 1972) is the current Secretary of State of Arkansas; elected in November 2018, he has served in the position since January 2019.

He previously served as Arkansas Commissioner of State Lands. A Republican, he was first elected to that position in November 2010, took office in January 2011, and was reelected in November 2014 to a second term.

Early life
Thurston graduated in 1991 from Sheridan High School in Grant County in southern Arkansas. He then attended Agape College in the capital city of Little Rock. He is a former licensed Christian minister and a Certified Religious Assistant in the Arkansas state prison system. He worked 13 years for Agape Church in Little Rock before entering politics.

Lands Commissioner
Thurston is the first Republican to be elected as Land Commissioner since the office became elective in 1874. In 2014, Thurston was elected as the president of the Western States Land Commissioners Association; the organization's winter conference was held in Little Rock that year.

Arkansas Secretary of State
Limited to two terms as state lands commissioner, Thurston announced in June 2016 he would run in 2018 for election as Arkansas secretary of state. As important issues, he cited election security, physical security, political accessibility, and redistricting of legislative boundaries. Thurston faced Trevor Drown in the Republican primary election, and was chosen as the Republican nominee. Running against former Director of Elections, Susan Inman, as the Democratic nominee, Thurston won election on November 6, 2018, as the next Arkansas Secretary of State.

Electoral history

2010 general election

2014 general election

2018 elections

References

External links
Arkansas Commissioner of State Lands

|-

|-

1972 births
Arkansas Republicans
American Christian clergy
Living people
People from Saline County, Arkansas
People from Sheridan, Arkansas
Politicians from Little Rock, Arkansas
Secretaries of State of Arkansas
Sheridan High School (Arkansas) alumni